Ghee is a type of clarified butter, originating from South Asia. It is commonly used in India for cooking, as a traditional medicine, and for religious rituals.

Description 
Ghee is typically prepared by simmering butter, which is churned from cream, skimming any impurities from the surface, then pouring and retaining the clear liquid fat while discarding the solid residue that has settled to the bottom. Spices can be added for flavor. The texture, color, and taste of ghee depend on the quality of the butter, the milk source used in the process, and the duration of boiling time.

Etymology 
The word ghee comes from  'clarified butter', from ghṛ- 'to sprinkle'.

In Hinduism and Buddhism 
Traditionally, ghee is made from bovine milk, either cow or water buffalo. Ghee has been used in rituals since the Vedic period and it is a sacred requirement in Vedic yajña and homa (fire rituals), through the medium of Agni (fire) to offer oblations to various deities (See: Yajurveda).

Fire rituals are utilized for ceremonies such as marriage and funerals. Ghee is required in Vedic worship of mūrtis (divine deities), with aarti (offering of ghee lamp) called diyā or dīpa and for Pañcāmṛta (Panchamruta) where ghee along with mishri, honey, milk, and dahi (curd) is used for bathing the deities on the appearance day of Krishna on Janmashtami, Śiva (Shiva) on Mahā-śivarātrī (Maha Shivaratri). There is a hymn to ghee. In the Mahabharata, the kaurava were born from pots of ghee.

Finding ghee pure enough to use for sacred purposes is a problem these days for devout Hindus, since many large-scale producers add salt to their product. Ghee is also used in bhang in order to heat the cannabis to cause decarboxylation, making the drink psychoactive.

In Buddhist scripture, stages of dairy production are used as metaphors for stages of enlightenment. The highest-stage product, sarpir-maṇḍa, is theorised to be ghee or clarified butter.

Culinary uses 
Ghee is common in cuisines from the Indian subcontinent, including traditional rice preparations (such as biryani). In Maharashtra, polis or Indian breads are accompanied with ghee. For example, 'Puranpoli', a typical Maharashtrian dish is eaten with much ghee. In Rajasthan, ghee often accompanies baati. All over north India, ghee tops roti. In Karnataka and Tamil Nadu, ghee tops dosa, and kesari bhath. In Bengal (both West Bengal and Bangladesh) and Gujarat, khichdi is a traditional evening meal of rice with lentils, cooked in curry made from dahi (yogurt), cumin seeds, curry leaves, cornflour, turmeric, garlic, salt and ghee. It is also an ingredient in kadhi and Indian sweets, such as Mysore pak and varieties of halva and laddu. Indian restaurants typically incorporate large amounts of ghee, sometimes brushing naan and roti with it, either during preparation or just before serving. In the state of Odisha ghee is widely used in regional Odia cuisines such as Khechedi and Dalma. Particularly the satwik type of food prepared in most temples in Odisha uses ghee as a major ingredient in their culinary tradition. Ghee is widely used in South Indian cuisine for tempering curries and in preparation of rice dishes and sweets. South Indians have a habit of adding ghee to their rice before eating it with pickles and curries. South Indians are among the biggest consumers of ghee. The people from  Andhra Pradesh especially use ghee for preparation of savoury and sweet dishes alike. Ghee is important to traditional North Indian cuisine, with parathas, daals and curries often using ghee instead of oil for a richer taste. The type of ghee, in terms of animal source, tends to vary with the dish; for example, ghee prepared from cow's milk is traditional with rice or roti or as a finishing drizzle atop a curry or daal (lentils) whereas buffalo-milk ghee is more typical for general cooking purposes.

Flavour 
The main flavour components of ghee are carbonyls, free fatty acids, lactones, and alcohols. Along with the flavour of milk fat, the ripening of the butter and temperature at which it is clarified also affect the flavour.

Differences from clarified butter
Ghee differs slightly in its production from that of clarified butter. The process of creating clarified butter is complete once the water is evaporated and the fat (clarified butter) is separated from the milk solids. However, the production of ghee includes simmering the butter, which makes it nutty-tasting and aromatic.

After leaving it covered at room temperature for around 12 hours, add a bit of dahi (yogurt) to it and leave it overnight. This makes more yogurt. This is churned with water, to obtain cultured butter, which is used to simmer into ghee.

Nutrition and health 
Like any clarified butter, ghee is composed almost entirely of fat, 62% of which consists of saturated fats. Most commercial preparations in India were also found to contain significant amount of trans fats. It has negligible amounts of lactose and casein and is, therefore, acceptable to most who have a lactose intolerance or milk allergy.

Outside the subcontinent

Several communities outside the Indian subcontinent make ghee. Egyptians make a product called samna baladi, meaning 'countryside butter', identical to ghee in terms of process and result, but commonly made from water buffalo milk instead of cow's milk, and white in color. The recipe is considered to have come from South Asia during ancient times of the Pharaoh as revealed in inscriptions and could be the result of Mitanni and Hittite kingdoms, which predate the existence of Greeks. Also, the darkened milk solids that are created during the process are considered a delicacy called morta, which is a salty condiment used sparingly as a spread, or as an addition on fava dishes. Regular samna is also made from cow's milk in Egypt and is often yellowish.

Ghee is also used by various peoples in the Horn of Africa. Tesmi (in Tigrinya language) is the clarified butter prepared in the country of Eritrea. The preparation is similar to that of ghee, but the butter is oftentimes combined with garlic and other spices found native to the area. In Ethiopia, niter kibbeh is used in much the same way as ghee, but with spices added during the process that result in distinctive tastes. In North Africa, Maghrebis take this one step further, ageing spiced ghee for months or even years, resulting in a product called smen.

It is also common in Western Africa especially among the Hausa and Fulanis. It is called Manshanu, meaning Cow's oil.

Preparation methods 

There are five common methods through which ghee is prepared. Industrial preparation on the other hand is done by using "white butter", usually sourced from other dairies and contractors.

Milk butter 
Sour raw milk is churned into butter. The butter is boiled in an open pan to allow the water to evaporate. The hot ghee is transferred and stored.

Direct cream 
Fresh cream, cultured or washed cream is directly converted to ghee. This method requires a long heating time and produces a caramelized flavor.

Cream butter 
Milk is separated into cream which is then churned into butter. The butter undergoes heat clarification to produce ghee.

Pre-stratification 
This method is suitable for large quantities of butter. Layers of protein particles, fat and buttermilk are induced. The buttermilk is drained out.

Traditional Ayurvedic recipe 
After leaving it covered at room temperature for around 12 hours, add a bit of dahi (yogurt) to it and leave it overnight. This makes more yogurt. This is churned with water, first to create butter milk then to obtain cultured butter, which is used to simmer into ghee.

Packaging 

Ghee is generally found to be packaged in airtight glass jars. They should be kept away from direct sunlight as sunlight can cause moisture to build inside the jar. Moisture can cause deterioration to the ghee's quality as well as reduce its shelf life. To prevent the acceleration of the oxidation process, they should be protected from anything that causes it, such as UV rays from sunlight and fluorescent lights. If the jar is unopened, it does not need to be refrigerated as long as the previously mentioned conditions are met. Once opened, they can be stored in a kitchen cabinet for up to three months. Afterwards, it may be left in the refrigerator for up to a year. The refrigerator causes ghee to harden but if it is left at room temperature for a while, it will soften up again.

Composition 
Ghee may be made of milk from various domesticated ungulates, such as cows, buffaloes and sheep. The composition of ghee varies depending on the animal whose milk has been used. The vitamin A content ranged from 315 to 375 μg per 100 grams. Palmitic acid and oleic acid were two of the main fatty acids found in both cow and sheep ghee. The saturated fatty acid profile was 53.9 to 66.8%, the unsaturated fatty acid profile was 22.8 to 38.0% and the other fatty acids was 3.5 to 10.4%. Cholesterol amounts ranged from 252 to 284 mg/100 grams.

Market 
The market size of ghee in India is 10,000 crores or US$1.5 billion as of 2016. India is the world's largest producer of buffalo and cow milk and consequently also the largest producer and consumer of ghee.

See also 

 Beurre noisette
 Chrism
 Manteiga-da-terra
 Smen
 Karnataka Milk Federation

References 

Bengali cuisine
Butter
Cooking fats
Egyptian cuisine
Indian cuisine
Kurdish cuisine
Nepalese cuisine
Pakistani cuisine
Somali cuisine
Tamil cuisine
Indian dairy products